Sunny Ozell, Lady Stewart (born December 23, 1978) is an American singer and songwriter who resides in England. She is married to the British actor Sir Patrick Stewart.

Early life
Ozell grew up in Reno, Nevada, in a musical household and began her classical training at an early age. Her parents did not play or perform themselves, but they had a passion for music and took music education seriously, getting Ozell to play the violin from the age of just four years old. She also started vocal training at the age of 11 years and soon after realised that music was the career path she wanted to pursue. From 13, she started working with an opera coach.

At university in Boulder, Colorado, she majored in English Literature and sang in blues bands and soul-funk bands in her spare time throughout college. After graduating, she started performing in clubs around New York and became a part of the city's musical community with her blend of jazz, blues and American roots music, performing both original material and interpretations of works by other renowned blues, soul and country songwriters.

Music career

She considers Take It with Me (which mainly consists of covers of works from artists such as Howard Jones, Hank Williams, Randy Newman, T Bone Burnett and Tom Waits) to be her debut album.
Both on Take It with Me and live, Sunny Ozell works with renowned musicians, including guitarist Aaron Lee Tasjan (Semi Precious Weapons, Drivin N Cryin), bassist Andy Hess (The Black Crowes, Gov't Mule, Uberjam), keyboard player Andrew Sherman (George Duke, Mariah Carey), pedal steel player Jon Graboff (Ryan Adams & The Cardinals), backing singer Nicki Richards (Madonna) and drummer Ethan Eubanks (Teddy Thompson, Crash Test Dummies, Joseph Arthur).
Ozell performs frequently at Rockwood Music Hall and The Living Room in New York and has collaborated with musicians such as Jim Campilongo and Adam Levy of Norah Jones’ backing band, and Krystle Warren.

Musical style and influence
Ozell cites Gillian Welch and David Rawlings as influences, for their "simplicity and their total lack of pretension", but also American jazz singer Cassandra Wilson, in particular her 1993 album Blue Light ‘til Dawn. She is also inspired by soul music that is not limited in any way to the traditional definition of the genre (i.e. Motown or Stax Records).

Personal life
Ozell is married to English actor Patrick Stewart. They met in 2008 at Franny's restaurant in New York where Ozell was working as a waitress while Stewart was performing in Macbeth at the nearby Brooklyn Academy of Music.

In March 2013, it was reported that Stewart and Ozell were engaged and they married on September 7, 2013, beside Lake Tahoe in Nevada with actor Ian McKellen officiating at the wedding ceremony. In marriage to Stewart, she has two stepchildren.

Discography

Take It with Me (2015)

Overnight Lows (2020)

Git Gone (single) (2015)

References

External links

 
 Sunny Ozell @ YouTube

1978 births
American women country singers
American country singer-songwriters
Singer-songwriters from New York (state)
American blues singers
Country blues singers
Living people
20th-century American singers
American women singer-songwriters
American jazz singers
American women jazz singers
20th-century American women singers
21st-century American singers
21st-century American women singers
Country musicians from New York (state)
American atheists
Wives of knights
Singer-songwriters from Nevada